Moczkowo  is a village in the administrative district of Gmina Barlinek, within Myślibórz County, West Pomeranian Voivodeship, in northwestern Poland.

For its history, see History of Pomerania.

References

Moczkowo